Denmark is primarily a transit and destination country for women and children from Baltic countries, East and Central Europe, Nigeria, Thailand, and South America subjected to trafficking in persons, specifically forced prostitution. There was one report last year of a male teenager from Nigeria rescued from the commercial sex trade in Denmark. The government did not report any cases of forced labor during the reporting period, though the Danish Anti-Trafficking Center highlighted that workers in domestic service, restaurants, hotels, factories, and agriculture, may be vulnerable to forced labor in Denmark. There were unconfirmed reports of foreign children being forced to engage in organized street crime. The government released a report in 2010 about increasing evidence that "au pair" organizations could be used as front companies for human trafficking. The hundreds of unaccompanied foreign minors who arrive in Denmark every year are particularly vulnerable to human trafficking. The United States Department of State placed the country in "Tier 2"  in their 2020Trafficking in Persons Report.

Prosecution
Denmark prohibits both sex and labor trafficking through Section 262 of its criminal code. Punishments prescribed for trafficking under section 262 extend up to eight years' imprisonment, are sufficiently stringent, and are commensurate with penalties prescribed for other serious crimes, such as rape. Police reported conducting a total of 44 human trafficking investigations during the reporting period. Using Section 262, the government prosecuted 25 people for sex trafficking and convicted 11 sex trafficking offenders in 2009. The government prosecuted additional alleged sex trafficking offenders under other statutes, such as prostitution procurement. All 11 trafficking offenders convicted in 2009 served some time in prison; none received suspended sentences. Sentences for convicted trafficking offenders ranged from 5 to 42 months' imprisonment. The Danish national police provided anti-trafficking training to all police precincts and new police recruits during the reporting period, and police leadership has taken a strategic approach to addressing the crime; however, the effectiveness of this training is still undetermined.

Protection
Denmark sustained its victim assistance and protection efforts over the year. In addition to employing formal victim identification procedures, the government conducted a proactive victim identification outreach program, interviewing people in prostitution, as well as in prisons and asylum centers, in an attempt to identify and rescue trafficking victims. The government identified 54 victims during the reporting period, down from 72 identified the previous year. The government offered medical, dental, psychological, and legal services, and in certain cases a stipend, to victims of trafficking during a 100-day reflection period – a time for victims to receive immediate care and assistance while they considered whether to assist law enforcement. There were two government-funded crisis centers for female victims of violence, which accommodated women trafficking victims. There were no specific shelter facilities for male victims, but at least one government-funded NGO offered assistance to men. The government offered child trafficking victims additional social services and placement in shelters or foster care. No support is provided to adult or child foreign victims of trafficking in Denmark beyond the reflection period if asylum or residency is not granted.

The government encouraged victims to assist in investigations of their traffickers, including by offering support of trained counselors during police interviews; however, many victims did not cooperate. It has been Danish NGOs' experience that 100 days is often not enough time for victims to develop sufficient trust in local authorities to disclose details of their trafficking experience. In addition, after the reflection period and trial process, victims of trafficking are most often deported to their country of origin, where authorities may not be able to provide protection. Trafficking victims were eligible to apply for asylum as an alternative to their removal to countries in which they would face retribution or hardship. This year, six people were determined by the Danish Immigration Service to be victims of trafficking and had asylum cases pending during the reporting period; one victim from 2008 was granted asylum in 2009. Police acknowledged factors preventing victims' cooperation with police, including fear of reprisal from traffickers and the knowledge they were going back to their home country. Denmark sustained partnerships with IOM and NGOs in victims' countries of origin to facilitate safe repatriation. The government provided foreign unaccompanied minors, regardless of whether or not they were suspected victims of trafficking, with a representative to assist with asylum applications or repatriation; however, it was documented that some children were placed in police custody for arriving with forged documents, a crime often occurring as a direct result of being trafficked. Danish victim advocates reported that Danish police generally respected the rights of victims, but claimed victims have been prosecuted for crimes committed as a direct result of being trafficked.

Prevention
While there is currently no nationwide government-sponsored anti-trafficking awareness campaign focused on all forms of trafficking, the government continued a campaign begun in 2008 called "Who Pays the Price?" to reduce the demand for commercial sex acts, which may be linked to sex trafficking. The government had an anti-trafficking action plan, and the government produced an annual status report monitoring the previous year's developments related to the plan. The government forged anti-trafficking partnerships through its funding of anti-trafficking programs in Ukraine, Belarus, and Moldova. Danish authorities sustained partnerships with Scandinavian Airlines, the Association of Danish Travel Agents, and Save the Children to disseminate public service announcements against child sex tourism. Denmark established a hotline for trafficking victims and one for information about suspected child sex tourism overseas. The government did not report any prosecutions of its citizens for child sex tourism during the reporting period. The Ministry of Defence provided training on human trafficking to all soldiers prior to their deployment abroad on international peacekeeping missions.

References

Denmark
Denmark
Human rights abuses in Denmark
Crime in Denmark by type